Tim Davies (born 1972) is an Australian orchestrator and composer for film, television, video games and the concert stage.

Education
Davies studied percussion and composition at the Queensland Conservatorium in Brisbane, and composition at the Elder Conservatorium and the University of Melbourne.

Career
After moving to the United States in 1998, he began his career working as a music arranger and orchestrator for numerous features, including Plan B, The First $20 Million Is Always the Hardest, and Missing Brendan. From there, he went on to work as the orchestrator on numerous larger budget films, including When a Stranger Calls, Death Race, Repo Men, and Kick Ass 2. As of 2021, he was the lead orchestrator for composers Christophe Beck, Mark Mothersbaugh, and Fil Eisler. He was lead orchestrator for Frozen and Frozen 2, Ant-Man and Ant-Man and the Wasp, Free Guy, The Lego Movie 2, The Croods: A New Age, Superintelligence and Thunder Force.

In 2002, Davies also started working in the realm of television, as the music arranger for the TV Movie Fitzgerald. Since then, he has worked as conductor and orchestrator on series such as Invasion, Pushing Daisies, Revenge, Empire, WandaVision, and Hawkeye. 

In 2014, Davies collaborated with Gustavo Santaolalla to compose the score to the film The Book of Life. In 2015, Guillermo del Toro, one of the producers on The Book of Life, brought Davies on to help score his movie Crimson Peak. From 2016 to 2018 Davies then composed the score to del Toro's animated Netflix show Trollhunters: Tales of Arcadia. In 2021 Davies reunited with The Book of Life director Jorge Gutierrez to score Gutierrez's Netflix show Maya and the Three.

Davies has also worked as the conductor and orchestrator on numerous video game titles, his debut work being for Sony's 2005 SOCOM 3 U.S. Navy SEALs. Since then, he's worked on titles such as Prototype, Resistance 3, Batman: Arkham City, Spider-Man, and Halo Infinite. He provided symphonic sound design on The Last of Us and Batman: Arkham Knight.

Davies also has experience as an arranger. In 2014, he arranged and played drums for the twentieth anniversary concert of NAS' Illmatic. In 2015, he served as lead arranger for Kendrick Lamar's performance of To Pimp a Butterfly, with the National Symphony at the Kennedy Center. In 2018, Davies provided arrangements for Kenny 'Babyface' Edmonds, again with the National Symphony at the Kennedy Center. Davies has also contributed a number of arrangements for concerts of the Metropole Orkest, working with artists such as Ledisi, Donny McCaslin, Cory Henry, and Moses Sumney.

Tim Davies Big Band
Tim Davies Big Band was founded in 1998, shortly before Davies moved to the United States. Once in LA, he created a new iteration of the band. Their first album, Epic, was released in 2002, followed, in 2009, by Dialmentia. In 2010, Davies was awarded a Grammy for his composition "Counting to Infinity". In 2016, Davies released his third album, The Expensive Train Set, incorporating performances from both Melbourne and LA iterations of his band, for which he received another Grammy nomination.

Filmography

Films

Television

Video games

Awards and nominations

References

External links
 
 Official Website
 Official Blog

1972 births
Australian composers
Annie Award winners
Living people
Origin Records artists
Varèse Sarabande Records artists